Jacques Bordeneuve (28 August 1908 Sainte-Livrade-sur-Lot – 31 January 1981 Neuilly-sur-Seine) was a French politician. He served as the state secretary for art and literature and as a senator.

References 

1908 births
1979 deaths
People from Lot-et-Garonne
Politicians from Nouvelle-Aquitaine
Radical Party (France) politicians
French Ministers of National Education
French Senators of the Fourth Republic
French Senators of the Fifth Republic
Senators of Lot-et-Garonne
Deputies of the 3rd National Assembly of the French Fifth Republic
French Resistance members
French people of the Algerian War